Nino Live is a 2011 Sri Lankan Sinhala comedy romance film directed by Thisara Imbulana and produced by Sahil Gupta. It stars Nino Jayakodi and Yureni Noshika in lead roles along with Dasun Pathirana and Umali Thilakarathne. Music composed by Sanka Dineth.

Plot
“Every man is surrounded by a neighbourhood of voluntary spies.” – George Washington Spying has always claimed the highest position in the hierarchy of human behaviour. And thus it forms the crux of the film “Nino Live”. Based in the modern age, the film shows how an entire life can go public in this era of wires and networks. The film revolves around the journey of a child from adolescence to early manhood, all caught on
celluloid. Ripping off his personal domain, his existence is dished out in the form of unedited footage, broadcast live 24/7 on television. This gigantic show, named “Nino Live”, becomes a way of life for thousands of reality TV struck fans around the country.

Cast
 Nino Jayakodi	as Nino
 Yureni Noshika as Nunu1
 Dasun Pathirana as Nishantha
 Umali Thilakarathne as Ruchi
 Steve De La Zilwa as Nonis
 Ruchi Disanayake as Nunu2
 Chandani Seneviratne as Nimmi
 Thusitha Laknath as Viraj
 Bandula Vithanage as Nino's Grandfather
 Kingsley Rathnayake
 Jagath Manuwarna

Soundtrack

References

External links
 Official trailer 1
නිනෝ ලයිව් විශේෂ දර්ශනය දා
සුනිල් ටී.භාර නොගත්තා නම් නිනෝ ලයිව් තාම ගෙදර
“තුරුණු හදගැස්මේ ශබ්දාලංකාරය” නිමෝ ලයිව් සිනමා විමසුම
රියැලිටියේ ෆැන්ටසිය ‘නිනෝ ලයිව්

2010s Sinhala-language films